Marcelo Gomes is a Brazilian film director, screenwriter and visual artist.

Early life
Gomes was born in Recife, Brazil.

Before going on to create films, he worked as a programmer of films at a film club.

Career
Gomes first directed several short films, a video, and a telemovie, between 1995 and 2000.

His debut feature film, Cinema, Aspirinas e Urubus, was screened in the Un Certain Regard section at the 2005 Cannes Film Festival.

His 2013 film The Man of the Crowd was screened in the Panorama section of the 64th Berlin International Film Festival.

The historical drama Joaquim, released in 2017, was nominated for many awards, including the Golden Bear at Berlinale, and won several, including Best Film at CinEuphoria in Portugal and at the Havana Film Festival New York.

His 2022 film  Paloma, based on a true story, tells of a transgender woman in rural Brazil who wishes to have a traditional Catholic wedding. It had its world premiere at the Munich Film Festival in June–July 2022, and was screened at the Adelaide Film Festival in October 2022.

Filmography
Gomes has directed both short and feature films, including:
 O Brasil em Curtas 06 - Curtas Pernambucanos (1999; video)
 Clandestina Felicidade (1999; short)
 Os Brasileiros (2000; TV film)
 Cinema, Aspirins and Vultures (2005; Cinema Aspirinas® e Urubus)
 I Travel Because I Have to, I Come Back Because I Love You (2009; Viajo Porque Preciso, Volto Porque te Amo), with Karim Aïnouz
 Once Upon a Time Was I, Verônica (2012)
 The Man of the Crowd (2013)
 Joaquim (2017)
 Waiting for the Carnival (2019; Estou Me Guardando Para Quando O Carnaval Chegar)
 Paloma (2022)

Recognition and awards
In 2005, Cinema, Aspirins and Vultures won the French National Education Prize. Many of his other films have won or been nominated for film awards, including:
2009: I Travel Because I Have to, I Come Back Because I Love You, winner, FIPRESCI prize, Havana Film Festival
2019: Waiting for the Carnival, selected for the masters program of the International Documentary Film Festival Amsterdam

References

External links

1963 births
Living people
Brazilian film directors
People from Recife
Brazilian screenwriters